Park Dong-cheol (born 1930) is a South Korean former weightlifter. He competed in the men's middle heavyweight event at the 1956 Summer Olympics.

References

External links
  

1930 births
Possibly living people
South Korean male weightlifters
Olympic weightlifters of South Korea
Weightlifters at the 1956 Summer Olympics
Place of birth missing (living people)
Medalists at the 1958 Asian Games
Asian Games bronze medalists for South Korea
Weightlifters at the 1958 Asian Games
Asian Games medalists in weightlifting
20th-century South Korean people